Nicolas Šikula (born 15 May 2003) is a Slovak footballer who plays for Železiarne Podbrezová as a right-back.

Club career

FK Železiarne Podbrezová
Šikula made his professional Fortuna Liga debut for Železiarne Podbrezová against MFK Ružomberok on 24 July 2022.

References

External links
 FK Železiarne Podbrezová official club profile 
 
 Futbalnet profile 
 

2003 births
Living people
Slovak footballers
Slovakia youth international footballers
Association football defenders
FK Železiarne Podbrezová players
Slovak Super Liga players
2. Liga (Slovakia) players